Trimley may refer to the following places in Suffolk, England:

Trimley railway station
Trimley Lower Street
Trimley St Mary
Trimley St Martin